CHET-FM is a Canadian radio station that broadcasts a community/campus format at 94.5 FM in Chetwynd, British Columbia. The station is owned by the Chetwynd Communications Society. CHET-FM and its television sister share studios on North Access Road in downtown Chetwynd.

CHET-FM began broadcasting on December 5, 1996, at 5:00 a.m.

In 2002 the station was given approval by the CRTC to add a 50-watt rebroadcast transmitter at 104.1 FM in Dawson Creek with the callsign CHAD-FM.

References

External links
Peace FM
 

HET
HET
Radio stations established in 1996
1996 establishments in British Columbia